Mariya Semyonovna Polivanova (24 October 1922 – 14 August 1942) was a Soviet sniper during World War II. On 14 August 1942, surrounded by German soldiers whilst she and her colleague Natalya Kovshova had only two grenades left, they set them off, killing themselves and surrounding German soldiers.  For their bravery she and Kovshova were posthumously awarded the title Hero of the Soviet Union on 14 February 1943.

Civilian life 
Polivanova was born on 24 October 1922 to a working-class Russian family in Naryshkino village. After graduating from her eighth grade of school in Spas-Konino she headed a reading room on a collective farm. After moving to the village of Novye Gorki (located in present-day Korolev, Moscow oblast) she worked at an order desk in a factory. In January 1940 she worked as a secretary in the welding department of the National Institute of Aviation Technologies in Moscow. Simultaneously she attended night school in hopes of gaining admission to the Moscow Aviation Institute.

Military career 
Polivanova joined the Red Army in June 1941 after Germany attacked the Soviet Union. Initially tasked with night watch on a roof as an observer, she later underwent sniper training, which she graduated from in August. In October she volunteered for the 3rd Moscow Communist Rifle Division, a Narodnoe Opolcheniye group to defend Moscow from German bombing attacks. In January 1942, she was transferred to the 528th Rifle Regiment on the Northwestern Front. Both Polivanova and Kovshova established themselves as skilled snipers and respected instructors in the battalion.

In February 1942, Polivanova was sent to the front, fighting for control of Novaya Russa. In doing so the unit was able to disable enemy machine-gun setups and positions. In the battle of Rutchevo, under heavy enemy fire she managed to carry many wounded soldiers from her unit to safety. Some time between March and May 1942 she was wounded in battle and taken to a field hospital, where Kovshova was sent only two days later.

In August 1942, the unit was deployed on to an offensive Sutoki-Byakovo. Not long into the battle the commanding officer was killed, so Kovshova took command of the unit. Polivanova served as Kovshova's spotter. When the German troops began their counterattack, she gave the command to open fire on them. The Germans realized there were snipers in the area, so they launched a barrage of mortar fire. When the fire stopped one soldier asked to retreat, Kovshova replied with the famous phrase "Not one step back!" Casualties piled up on the Soviet side, leaving only three snipers alive, one of whom was too injured to continue fighting and the other two were Polivanova and Kovshova, who were injured but continued fighting. When they started to realize they were running low on ammunition while German forces were drawing closer and closer, Polivanova and Kovshova kissed before making their last stand, detonating the last of their grenades, killing themselves and surrounding German troops. They were both awarded the title Hero of the Soviet Union posthumously on 14 February 1943 in recognition of their relentless efforts in combat.

Awards and recognition

Awards 
 Hero of the Soviet Union
 Order of Lenin
 Order of the Red Star

Memorials and commemoration 
 A 1944 Soviet postage stamp (pictured) depicts Polivanova and Kovshova in their last stand.
 There are streets bearing her name in Aleksin, Maryovo, Moscow, Sevastopol, Surgut, and Zaluchye.

See also 

 List of female Heroes of the Soviet Union
 List of last stands
 Natalya Kovshova
 Valeriya Gnarovskaya

References

Bibliography 

 

1922 births
1942 deaths
Heroes of the Soviet Union
Women in the Russian and Soviet military
Soviet military personnel killed in World War II
Recipients of the Order of Lenin
Soviet military snipers